Fenton is a village in Jefferson Davis Parish, Louisiana, United States. The population was 379 at the 2010 census. It is part of the Jennings Micropolitan Statistical Area.

Thomas A. "Tom" Greene, a former state senator from Iberville Parish, graduated in 1966 from Fenton High School.

Geography
Fenton is located in northwestern Jefferson Davis Parish at  (30.364271, -92.917514). U.S. Route 165 passes through the center of town, leading northeast  to Kinder and southwest  to Iowa.

Demographics

As of the census of 2000, there were 380 people, 141 households, and 101 families residing in the village. The racial makeup of the village was 45.26% White, 52.37% African American, 0.26% Native American, 0.26% Asian, 0.53% from other races, and 1.32% from two or more races. Hispanic or Latino of any race were 2.11% of the population.

There were 141 households, out of which 41.1% had children under the age of 18 living with them, 48.9% were married couples living together, 17.7% had a female householder with no husband present, and 27.7% were non-families. 26.2% of all households were made up of individuals, and 14.2% had someone living alone who was 65 years of age or older. The average household size was 2.69 and the average family size was 3.23.

In the village, the population was spread out, with 32.9% under the age of 18, 10.3% from 18 to 24, 25.0% from 25 to 44, 21.3% from 45 to 64, and 10.5% who were 65 years of age or older. The median age was 31 years. For every 100 females, there were 94.9 males. For every 100 females age 18 and over, there were 83.5 males.

The median income for a household in the village was $21,125, and the median income for a family was $25,625. Males had a median income of $25,417 versus $21,250 for females. The per capita income for the village was $9,958. About 29.1% of families and 33.3% of the population were below the poverty line, including 45.1% of those under age 18 and 19.4% of those age 65 or over.

References

External links
Village of Fenton official website

Villages in Jefferson Davis Parish, Louisiana
Villages in Louisiana